Jörg Schönbohm (2 September 1937 – 7 February 2019) was a German politician (CDU) and a retired lieutenant general. He was the first commander of the Bundeswehr Eastern Command (BwKdo Ost) in 1990, which supervised the absorption of the East German National People's Army into the Federal German armed forces as part of the Army of Unity (Armee der Einheit). In 1991 he became the Inspector of the Army, the highest-ranking officer in the German Army; he was retired in 1992 to become Undersecretary for Security Policy in the Federal Ministry of Defence. From 1996 to 1998 Schönbohm was Senator of the Interior for the city of Berlin, and from 1999 to 2009 he held the same office as interior minister for the state of Brandenburg.

Personal life
Schönbohm was Protestant, and married with three children. He resided in Kleinmachnow in Potsdam-Mittelmark. His son Arne Schönbohm became president of the German Federal Office for Information Security in 2016. Jörg Schönbohm died on 7 February 2019 at the age of 81.

Award
2009 – Manfred Wörner Medal

Works
Jörg Schönbohm, Two Armies and One Fatherland: The End of the Nationale Volksarmee, Berghahn Books, 1996,

References

External links

Official Bio: German Army

1937 births
2019 deaths
People from Oder-Spree
People from the Province of Brandenburg
Christian Democratic Union of Germany politicians
Ministers of the Brandenburg State Government
Members of the Landtag of Brandenburg
Senators of Berlin
Bundeswehr generals
Lieutenant generals of the German Army
20th-century German politicians
21st-century German politicians
Commanders Crosses of the Order of Merit of the Federal Republic of Germany
Military personnel from Brandenburg